Lexton is a town in western Victoria, Australia, in the Shire of Pyrenees local government area. At the 2016 Australian census, Lexton and the surrounding area had a population of 231.

History

The Post Office opened in the area on 1 July 1848 as Burn Bank and was renamed to Lexton in 1854 when the township was settled.

Diarist Charles Evans stopped in the area in 1854 on his way to the Avoca goldfields and described his visit as such:

Today
The town has an Australian Rules football team competing in the Maryborough Castlemaine District Football League.

Golfers play at the course of the Lexton Golf Club at the Recreation Reserve.

Lexton is host to the annual Rainbow Serpent Festival.

Notable people
Darren Jolly - Former Collingwood football player

References

External links

Towns in Victoria (Australia)